The 14th Sarasaviya Awards festival (Sinhala: 14වැනි සරසවිය සම්මාන උලෙළ), presented by the Associated Newspapers of Ceylon Limited, was held to honor the best films of 1985 Sinhala cinema on July 19, 1986, at the Bandaranaike Memorial International Conference Hall, Colombo 07, Sri Lanka. Srimani Athulathmudali was the chief guest at the awards night.

The film Suddilage Kathaawa won the most awards with seven including Best Film.

Awards

References

Sarasaviya Awards
Sarasaviya